This is a list of invasive species in Europe. A species is regarded as invasive if it has become introduced to a location, area, or region where it did not previously occur naturally (i.e., is not a native species) and becomes capable of establishing a breeding population in the new location. An invasive species will be one that thrives in its new environment and negatively influences the ecology and biodiversity of that ecosystem. Negative effects can also affect humans, by compromising health (e.g. vectors of diseases) or socioeconomic systems (e.g. damages to agriculture or forestry).

The term invasive species refers to a subset of those species defined as introduced species. If a species has been introduced but remains local, and is not problematic to human systems or to the local biodiversity, then it does not belong on this list.

Plants

Acacia sp. 
Ailanthus altissima (Tree of heaven)
Alternanthera philoxeroides (alligator weed)
Amorpha fruticosa (Desert false indigo)
Ambrosia artemisiifolia (Ragweed)
Asclepias syriaca (common milkweed)
Baccharis halimifolia (Eastern baccharis)
Buddleja davidii 
Cabomba caroliniana (fanwort)
Carpobrotus edulis (Hottentot fig)
Clematis vitalba (Old man's beard)
Cortaderia spp. 
Crassula helmsii (Australian swamp stonecrop)
Eichhornia crassipes (water hyacinth)
Elodea canadensis (Canadian pondweed)
Elodea nuttallii (Nuttall's waterweed)
Gleditsia triacanthos (honey locust)
Gunnera tinctoria (Chilean rhubarb)
Heracleum mantegazzianum (giant hogweed)
Heracleum persicum (Persian hogweed)
Heracleum sosnowskyi (Sosnowsky's hogweed)
Hydrocotyle ranunculoides (Floating pennywort)
Impatiens glandulifera (Himalayan balsam)
Lagarosiphon major (curly waterweed)
Lantana camara 
Ludwigia grandiflora (water-primrose)
Ludwigia peploides (floating primrose-willow)
Lysichiton americanus (American skunk cabbage)
Myriophyllum aquaticum (Parrot feather)
Myriophyllum heterophyllum (broadleaf watermilfoil)
Nicotiana glauca 
Oxalis pes-caprae (buttercup oxalis) 
Pennisetum setaceum (crimson fountaingrass)
Pueraria lobata (kudzu vine)
Reynoutria japonica (syn. Fallopia japonica) (Japanese knotweed)
Rhododendron ponticum (pontic rhododendron)
Robinia pseudoacacia (black locust)
Rosa rugosa 
Tradescantia fluminensis

Algae

Caulerpa racemosa (Grape caulerpa) 
Caulerpa taxifolia, Mediterranean clone

Animals

Bryozoans
 Bugula neritina (brown bryozoan)
 Schizoporella errata (branching bryozoan)
 Tricellaria inopinata

Cnidarians
 Cordylophora caspia (euryhaline hydroid)
 Rhopilema nomadica (nomad jellyfish)

Ctenophores
 Mnemiopsis leidyi (warty comb jelly)

Arthropods

Crustaceans
 Balanus improvisus (Bay barnacle)
 Cercopagis pengoi (fishhook waterflea)
 Chelicorophium curvispinum (Caspian mud shrimp)
 Dikerogammarus villosus (Killer shrimp)
 Elminius modestus (Australasian barnacle)
 Eriocheir sinensis (Chinese mitten crab) 
 Hemigrapsus takanoi (brush-clawed shore crab)
 Hemimysis anomala (bloody-red mysid)
 imnomysis benedeni (Donau-Schwebgarnele)
 Limnoria lignorum (gribble)
 Orconectes limosus (Spiny-cheek crayfish)
 Orconectes virilis (Virile crayfish)
 Pacifastacus leniusculus (Signal crayfish)
 Palaemon elegans (rockpool shrimp)
 Paralithodes camtschaticus (Red king crab) 
 Percnon gibbesi (Sally Lightfoot crab)
 Pontogammarus robustoides
 Procambarus clarkii (Louisiana crawfish)

Insects
 Adelges piceae (balsam woolly adelgid)
 Aedes albopictus (tiger mosquito)
 Agrilus planipennis (emerald ash borer)
 Aleurodicus dispersus (spiralling whitefly)
 Aphis spiraecola (green citrus aphid)
 Aproceros leucopoda (elm zigzag sawfly)
 Aromia bungii (red necked longicorn)
 Bemisia tabaci (silverleaf whitefly) 
 Cacyreus marshalli (geranium bronze)
 Cameraria ohridella (horse-chestnut leaf miner)
 Ceratitis capitata (Mediterranean fruit fly)
 Chilo suppressalis (striped rice stem borer)
 Cinara cupressi (Cypress aphid)
 Corythucha ciliata (sycamore lace bug)
 Cryptotermes brevis (West Indian drywood termite)
 Ctenarytaina eucalypti (blue gum psyllid)
 Cydalima perspectalis (box tree moth)
 Dendroctonus micans (great spruce bark beetle)
 Diabrotica virgifera (Western corn rootworm)
 Dreyfusia nordmannianae (silver fir adelges)
 Drosophila suzukii (spotted wing drosophila)
 Dryocosmus kuriphilus (chestnut gall wasp) 
 Epiphyas postvittana  (light brown apple moth)
 Frankliniella occidentalis (western flower thrips)
 Gilpinia hercyniae (European spruce sawfly)
 Harmonia axyridis (Asian lady beetle)
 Hypogeococcus pungens (cactus mealybug)
 Icerya purchasi (cottony cushion scale)
 Lasius neglectus (invasive garden ant)
 Leptinotarsa decemlineata (Colorado beetle)
 Leptocybe invasa (blue gum chalcid)
 Lilioceris lilii (scarlet lily beetle)
 Linepithema humile (Argentine ant)
 Lysiphlebus testaceipes
 Megastigmus spermotrophus (Douglas-fir seed chalcid)
 Opogona sacchari (banana moth)
 Monomorium pharaonis (Pharaoh ant)
 Paratrechina longicornis (longhorn crazy ant)
 Paysandisia archon (castniid palm borer)
 Pheidole megacephala (big-headed ant)
 Phoracantha semipunctata (Australian Eucalyptus longhorn)
 Phyllonorycter issikii (lime leaf miner)
 Rhagoletis cingulata (eastern cherry fruit fly)
 Scaphoideus titanus (American grapevine leafhopper)
 Thaumastocoris peregrinus (bronze bug)
 Trialeurodes ricini (castor bean whitefly)
 Vespa velutina nigrithorax (Yellow-legged Asian hornet)
 Vespula germanica (European wasp)
 Vespula vulgaris (common wasp)
 Xyleborus perforans (island pinhole borer)
 Xylosandrus germanus (black timber bark beetle)

Chordates

Ascidians
 Microcosmus squamiger
 Polyandrocarpa zorritensis
 Styela clava (Stalked sea squirt)

Amphibians
 Lithobates catesbeianus (American Bullfrog)
 Xenopus laevis (African clawed frog)

Birds

 Acridotheres tristis (common myna)
 Alopochen aegyptiacus (Egyptian goose)
 Amandava amandava (red avadavat) 
 Branta canadensis (Canada goose)
 Corvus splendens (House crow)
 Estrilda astrild (common waxbill)
 Estrilda troglodytes (black-rumped waxbill)
 Euodice cantans (African silverbill)
 Euplectes afer (yellow-crowned bishop)
 Leiothrix lutea (Red-billed leiothrix)
 Myiopsitta monachus (Monk parakeet)
 Oxyura jamaicensis (Ruddy duck)
 Phasianus colchicus (common pheasant)
 Ploceus cucullatus (village weaver)
 Ploceus melanocephalus (black-headed weaver)
 Psittacula krameri (Rose-ringed parakeet)
 Threskiornis aethiopicus (African sacred ibis)

Fish
 Alburnus alburnus (common bleak)
 Ameiurus melas (Black bullhead (catfish))
 Australoheros facetus (Chameleon cichlid)
 Carassius auratus (goldfish)
 Carassius gibelio (Prussian carp)
 Cyprinus carpio (common carp)
 Esox lucius (northern pike)
 Fundulus heteroclitus (mummichog)
 Gambusia holbrooki (eastern mosquitofish)
 Hypophthalmichthys nobilis (bighead carp)
 Lepomis gibbosus (Pumpkinseed sunfish)
 Leuciscus leuciscus (common dace)
 Micropterus salmoides (Largemouth Bass)
 Neogobius fluviatilis (monkey goby)
 Neogobius melanostomus (round goby)
 Oncorhynchus mykiss (rainbow trout)
 Perccottus glenii (Chinese sleeper)
 Pseudorasbora parva (stone moroko)
 Rutilus rutilus (common roach)
 Sander lucioperca (Sander lucioperca)

Mammals
 Ammotragus lervia (Barbary sheep)
 Axis axis (chital)
 Callosciurus erythraeus (Pallas' squirrel)
 Callosciurus finlaysonii (Finlayson's squirrel)
 Capra hircus (feral goat)
 Castor canadensis (North American beaver)
 Cervus nippon (sika deer)
 Equus asinus (donkey)
 Felis catus (feral cat)
 Lepus europaeus (European hare)
 Muntiacus reevesi (Reeves's muntjac)
 Mustela furo (ferret)
 Myocastor coypus (coypu, nutria)
 Neogale vison (American mink)
 Nyctereutes procyonoides (raccoon dog)
 Ondatra zibethicus (muskrat)
 Ovis aries (sheep)
Ovis aries musimon (European mouflon)
 Procyon lotor (common raccoon)
 Rattus norvegicus (brown rat)
 Rattus rattus (black rat)
 Sciurus carolinensis (grey squirrel)
 Tamias sibiricus (Siberian chipmunk)
 Urva auropunctata (small Indian mongoose)

Reptiles
 Chamaeleo chamaeleon (common chameleon)
 Trachemys scripta elegans (Red-eared slider)
 Pelodiscus sinensis (Chinese softshell turtle)
 Lampropeltis californiae (California Kingsnake)

Molluscs
 Arion vulgaris (Spanish slug)
 Deroceras invadens (tramp slug)

Marine

 Arcuatula senhousia (Asian date mussel)
 Brachidontes pharaonis (variable mussel)
 Crassostrea gigas (Pacific oyster)
 Crepidula fornicata (Common slipper shell)
 Ensis directus (American jack-knife clam)
 Petricolaria pholadiformis (false angel wing)
 Pinctada radiata (Atlantic pearl-oyster)
 Rapana venosa (Veined rapa whelk)

Freshwater

 Corbicula fluminalis
 Corbicula fluminea (Freshwater bivalve mollusk)
 Dreissena polymorpha (Zebra mussel)
 Dreissena rostriformis bugensis (Quagga mussel)
 Potamopyrgus antipodarum (New Zealand mud snail)
 Sinanodonta woodiana (Chinese pond mussel)

Annelids
 Ficopomatus enigmaticus (Australian tubeworm)
 Lumbricus terrestris (common earthworm)
 Marenzelleria neglecta (red gilled mud worm)

Nematodes
 Anguillicoloides crassus (swim bladder worm)
 Globodera rostochiensis (yellow potato cyst nematode)

Platyhelminthes
 Arthurdendyus triangulatus (New Zealand flatworm)
 Australoplana sanguinea (Australian flatworm)
 Bothriocephalus acheilognathi (Asian tapeworm)

Fungi
Clathrus archeri (Berk.) Dring
Hymenoscyphus fraxineus (T. Kowalski) Baral, Queloz, Hosoya (ash dieback disease)
 Ophiostoma ulmi (Dutch elm disease)

European priorities 
Different initiatives have been promoted in order to prioritize species among this long (and ongoing) list. Some examples are:

 "100 of the Worst Invasive Species of Europe". Delivering Alien Invasive Species Inventories for Europe (DAISIE) - http://www.europe-aliens.org/default.do

See also
 List of invasive alien species of Union concern (official list pursuant to Article 12(1) of the EU Regulation 1143/2014 on Invasive Alien Species).

References

External links
 

Invasive
Invasive species
Europe